Cumia adjuncta is a species of sea snail, a marine gastropod mollusk in the family Colubrariidae, the spindle snails, the tulip snails and their allies.

Description

Distribution
This species is distributed in the seas along New Zealand.

References

Colubrariidae
Gastropods described in 1929